The Bible Tower is situated in Thrissur city of Kerala, India. It was inaugurated on 7 January 2007. The tower is the tallest church tower in India and 3rd tallest in Asia after the church towers in Philippines and Lebanon. It is also the tallest structure in whole of Kerala. The 79 metre (260 ft) tower stands behind two towers of 42.5 metres (140 ft) height.

References

External links

 Official web site of the Bible Tower
 Tourist Places, Thrissur

Towers in India
Roman Catholic churches in Kerala
Churches in Thrissur
Tourist attractions in Thrissur